Harry Mortimer (23 November 1872 – 18 July 1953) was an English first-class cricketer, who played only one first-class match, which was for Worcestershire against Kent in August 1904. Batting at ten, he scored 4 and 7, and made no dismissals behind the stumps.

Mortimer was born at Sculcoates, Hull, and died in King's Norton, Birmingham at the age of 80.

External links 
 

1872 births
1953 deaths
English cricketers
Cricketers from Kingston upon Hull
People from Sculcoates
Worcestershire cricketers
English cricketers of 1890 to 1918